Ashu Malik (born 6 April 1983) is an Indian politician belonging to the Samajwadi Party. He is a member of the 18th Uttar Pradesh Assembly, represents the Saharanpur constituency of Uttar Pradesh and also has earlier been a member of the Uttar Pradesh Legislative Council.

See also
Uttar Pradesh Legislative Assembly
18th Uttar Pradesh Assembly
Samajwadi Party

References 

1983 births
Living people
Samajwadi Party politicians from Uttar Pradesh
Members of the Uttar Pradesh Legislative Council
Place of birth missing (living people)
Uttar Pradesh MLAs 2022–2027